Willow Creek Provincial Park is a provincial park in Alberta, Canada.

The Wilson Creek Natural Area is an extension of the park. It is located in the Municipal District of Willow Creek No. 26, Alberta, northwest of the Town of Claresholm.

It was established on December 10, 1957.

See also
List of provincial parks in Alberta
List of Canadian provincial parks
List of National Parks of Canada

External links
Alberta Development - Willow Creek Provincial Park

Provincial parks of Alberta
Municipal District of Willow Creek No. 26